The Historic Arkansas Riverwalk is a riverwalk in the US city of Pueblo, Colorado, along the Arkansas River. The riverwalk was constructed as part of an effort to attract tourists and trade to the city. Its construction was inspired by the San Antonio Riverwalk in the city of San Antonio, Texas.

Pueblo was founded near the confluence of Fountain Creek and the Arkansas River. After a flood in 1921, the river was diverted to Pueblo Reservoir. The original riverbed was excavated as part of an urban renewal project, and the river was again rerouted. The project continues to be improved and expanded.

References

Further reading
 

Pueblo, Colorado
Parks in Colorado
Tourist attractions in Pueblo, Colorado
Transportation in Pueblo County, Colorado